Oksza  is a village in the administrative district of Gmina Witnica, within Gorzów County, Lubusz Voivodeship, in western Poland.

See also
Territorial changes of Poland after World War II

References

Oksza